Outside the Wire is a 2021 American science fiction action film directed by Mikael Håfström. It stars Anthony Mackie (who also produced) as an android officer who works with a drone pilot (Damson Idris) to stop a global catastrophe. Emily Beecham, Michael Kelly, and Pilou Asbæk also star. The film was released by Netflix on January 15, 2021, and received mixed reviews from critics.

Plot

In 2036, a civil war between pro-Russian insurgents and a resistance movement in Ukraine leads the US to deploy peacekeeping forces. During an operation, a team of US Marines and robotic soldiers, called "G.U.M.P."s, are ambushed. Disobeying an order, drone pilot Lt. Harp deploys a Hellfire missile in a drone strike against a suspected enemy launcher, killing two Marines caught in the killzone but saving the lead Lieutenant  and remaining 38 Marines who would have been killed by the launcher. As punishment, Harp is redeployed to combat duty at Camp Nathaniel, the US base of operations in Ukraine. Harp is assigned to Capt. Leo, a highly advanced and experimental android super-soldier masquerading as a human officer, a secret known only by Harp and camp commander Col. Eckhart.

Harp and Leo, under the cover of delivering vaccines to a refugee camp, set out on a mission to prevent terrorist Victor Koval from gaining control of a network of Cold War–era nuclear missile silos. On the way, they respond to a reported attack on a friendly aid truck, resulting in a stand-off between the Marines and armed locals. After a G.U.M.P. shoots a local who threw a rock, Leo negotiates a peaceful solution by giving the locals the contents of the aid truck. However, pro-Russian insurgents ambush the locals and Marines, leading to a firefight. This forces Leo and Harp to travel to the refugee camp on foot, while the Marines remain behind to engage the insurgents.

At the refugee compound, Leo and Harp are shot at by an insurgent, who kills some civilians. Leo tortures the insurgent for information, before leaving him to be killed by the gathered mob. Leo and Harp meet their contact Sofiya, a resistance leader. Sofiya leads them to an arms dealer who knows the location of a bank vault containing nuclear launch codes that Koval is looking for. Harp and Leo travel to the bank and are met by Koval's forces, which include several Russian built G.U.M.P.s. Harp rescues a few of the civilians caught in a crossfire between US and Russian G.U.M.P.s, while Leo retrieves the codes but cannot find Koval. A drone strike called in by Eckhart destroys the bank and several buildings, leading the military command to believe Koval dead and Leo destroyed.

Leo reunites with Harp, and tells him that he has his own plans for the codes, and has been manipulating Harp into helping him evade the eye of military command. He knocks out Harp and leaves him on the side of the road where he is picked up by Sofiya's men. Leo meets with Koval to give him the codes but kills him when Koval refuses to give Leo access to a nuclear missile silo. Harp informs Sofiya and Eckhart of Leo's actions, and they realize that Leo is planning to launch the nuclear missiles to strike the United States, in order to prevent them from fighting more wars in the future. Harp volunteers to infiltrate the silo and finds Leo has taken over. He disables Leo but not before Leo initiates the launch of a missile, explaining that his goal was for the android super-soldier program to end in failure. Harp escapes as the silo is destroyed by a drone strike before the missile can launch; destroying Leo in the process and saving the states. With his field work now over with, Harp returns to Camp Nathaniel and receives praise from Eckhart, who informs him that he will be returning to his Stateside drone pilot duties.

Cast

 Anthony Mackie as Leo
 Damson Idris as Harp
 Enzo Cilenti as Miller
 Emily Beecham as Sofiya
 Henry Garrett as Brydon
 Kristina Tonteri-Young as Bale
 Pilou Asbæk as Victor Koval
 Michael Kelly as Eckhart

Production
The film was announced in June 2019, with Anthony Mackie set to star and produce, and Mikael Håfström to direct. Damson Idris and Emily Beecham joined the cast the following month. Michael Kelly and Pilou Asbæk signed on later. Filming began around Budapest in August 2019, lasting eight weeks.

Release
Outside the Wire was released by Netflix digitally on January 15, 2021. The film was the most-watched on the platform over its debut weekend. On April 20, 2021, Netflix reported that the film was watched by 66 million households during its first quarter.

Critical response
The website's critics consensus reads, "A serviceable sci-fi diversion, Outside the Wire packs enough action to keep viewers watching – even if they aren't likely to remember much later." According to Metacritic, which calculated a weighted average score of 45 out of 100 based on 15 critics, the film received "mixed or average reviews".

David Ehrlich of IndieWire gave the film a grade of C and wrote that "...the result of [the screenwriters'] efforts is a high-concept slab of 'Netflix movie of the week' sci-fi that wrestles with some big questions about the future of modern warfare via a conceit that borders dangerously close to Chappie."

References

External links
 

2021 films
2021 action thriller films
2021 science fiction action films
2020s science fiction thriller films
2020s science fiction war films
American action thriller films
American science fiction action films
American science fiction thriller films
American science fiction war films
Android (robot) films
Drone films
English-language Netflix original films
Films about nuclear war and weapons
Films about terrorism in Europe
Films about the United States Air Force
Films directed by Mikael Håfström
Films scored by Lorne Balfe
Films set in 2036
Films set in Russia
Films set in Ukraine
Films shot in Budapest
2020s English-language films
2020s American films